Jim Courier defeated Arnaud Boetsch 6–2, 7–5 to secure the title.

Seeds

  Yevgeny Kafelnikov (quarterfinals)
  Wayne Ferreira (first round)
  Jim Courier (champion)
  Richard Krajicek (semifinals)
  Patrick Rafter (quarterfinals)
  Jason Stoltenberg (second round)
  Renzo Furlan (second round)
  Mark Woodforde (semifinals)

Draw

Finals

Section 1

Section 2

External links
1995 Adelaide International Draw

Singles
Next Generation Adelaide International
1995 in Australian tennis